Bisoctrizole (INN/USAN, marketed by BASF as Tinosorb M, by DSM Nutritional Products as Parsol Max , by Everlight Chemical as Eversorb M, and by MPI as Milestab 360, INCI methylene bis-benzotriazolyl tetramethylbutylphenol) is a phenolic benzotriazole that is added to sunscreens to absorb UV rays. It is a broad-spectrum ultraviolet radiation absorber, absorbing UVB as well as UVA rays.  It also reflects and scatters UV. 

Bisoctrizole is what is termed is a hybrid UV absorber, which has been described as an organic UV filter produced in microfine organic particles (< 200 nm), like microfine zinc oxide and titanium dioxide. Where other organic UV absorbers dissolved in either the oily or aqueous phases, bisoctrizole dissolves poorly in both.

Hence, bisoctrizole is formulated in sunscreen preparations as a 50% suspension,  the absorber added to the water phase, and mineral micropigments usually added to the oil phase. The bisoctrizole particles are stabilized by the surfactant decyl glucoside. The compound shows very little photodegradation, and has a stabilizing effect on other UV absorbers, octyl methoxycinnamate (octinoxate) in particular.

In primary research reports, bisoctrizole has been reported to minimally penetrate skin, and has been described as lacking estrogenic effects in vitro.

As of this date, bisoctrizole had not been approved by the U.S. Food and Drug Administration (FDA), but is approved in the EU and other parts of the world.

References

External links
 Ciba® TINOSORB® M – Microfine UV absorber with Triple Action
 http://www.dermatologytimes.com/dermatologytimes/article/articleDetail.jsp?id=159652
 NEW-WAVE SUNSCREENS – Active ingredient makers are frustrated by the long list of sunscreens and UV-A testing protocols that are still awaiting FDA decisions, C&EN Cover Story
 https://www.fda.gov/ohrms/dockets/dockets/05n0446/05n-0446-bkg0001-03-Tab-01-vol2.pdf

Sunscreening agents
Benzotriazoles
Phenols